Jalan Klang Lama or Old Klang Road, Federal Route 2 is the oldest and the first major road in Kuala Lumpur, Malaysia. It was built before the Federal Highway was built in 1965. The road was constructed by the Federation of Malaya government from 1956 to 1959. The road was opened on 14 January 1959 by the Ministry of Public Works, Sardon Jubir. The road passing the two towns namely Sungei Way and Petaling Jaya.

History

The Kuala Lumpur–Klang Highway FT2 was opened to traffic on 14 January 1959. The highway was intended as a replacement of the existing road system known as Jalan Klang Lama, Persiaran Selangor, Jalan Sungai Rasau and Jalan Batu Tiga Lama, allowing speeds of up to 60 mph. As a result, Jalan Klang Lama was downgraded into Selangor State Road B14. The Kuala Lumpur–Klang Highway FT2 was later being upgraded into a controlled-access highway by replacing the former at-grade intersection with grade-separated interchanges, making the highway as the nation's first controlled-access expressway. The upgraded controlled-access highway is now known as the Federal Highway Route 2.

Landmarks
Mid Valley Megamall
JKL Furnishing Centre
The Scott Garden
Pearl Point 
Eco Park
9 Seputeh

Residential
South Bank Residence Old Klang Road. 58000 Kuala Lumpur.
 SouthBankResidence.comSouth Bank Residence UOA Project at Old Klang Road – Property Information Website

List of interchanges and junctions

See also
 Jalan Syed Putra
 Federal Highway
 Malaysia Federal Route 2

References

Expressways and highways in the Klang Valley
Highways in Malaysia
Roads in Kuala Lumpur